Jon Gaztañaga Arrospide (born 28 June 1991) is a Spanish professional footballer who plays as a central defender or a defensive midfielder for Cypriot First Division club Karmiotissa Polemidion FC.

Club career
Born in Andoain, Gipuzkoa, Gaztañaga was a product of Real Sociedad's youth system. He made his senior debut with their reserves, spending several seasons in the Segunda División B with the side and also achieving promotion from Tercera División in 2010.

Gaztañaga made his official debut with the first team on 18 August 2013, replacing fellow youth graduate Gorka Elustondo in the dying minutes of the 2–0 La Liga home win against Getafe CF. His first appearance in the UEFA Champions League took place on 10 December, as he came on for Mikel González in a 0–1 group-stage defeat to Bayer 04 Leverkusen also at the Anoeta Stadium.

In early 2014, Gaztañaga renewed his contract with Real Sociedad until 2016, being promoted to the main squad in May. On 26 January 2015, having featured sparingly during the first half of the campaign, he joined Segunda División club SD Ponferradina on loan until June.

On 9 July 2015, Gaztañaga was loaned to CD Numancia of the same league for one year. On 22 August 2017, he agreed to a three-year deal with Gimnàstic de Tarragona also from the second tier after becoming a free agent.

Gaztañaga terminated his contract with Nàstic on 13 June 2018. On 20 August, he moved abroad for the first time in his career and joined Cypriot First Division side AEL Limassol. He made his debut five days later, coming on for Marko Adamović late into a 1–0 away victory over Ermis Aradippou FC.

Gaztañaga spent 2020–21 in the Romanian Liga I with FC Viitorul Constanța. On 24 June 2021, he returned to Spain and joined Cultural y Deportiva Leonesa of the newly created Primera División RFEF.

On 7 September 2022, Gaztañaga signed for NorthEast United FC of the Indian Super League on a one-year contract.

International career
Gaztañaga was picked by the Spain under-17 team for the 2008 UEFA European Championship. He started as a stopper in the final against France, which ended with a 4–0 win.

Gaztañaga was selected by the under-18 side for the unofficial 2009 Copa del Atlántico, which his country won.

Career statistics

Honours
Real Sociedad B
Tercera División: 2009–10

AEL Limassol
Cypriot Cup: 2018–19

Spain U17
UEFA European Under-17 Championship: 2008

References

External links

1991 births
Living people
People from Andoain
Sportspeople from Gipuzkoa
Spanish footballers
Footballers from the Basque Country (autonomous community)
Association football defenders
Association football midfielders
Association football utility players
La Liga players
Segunda División players
Segunda División B players
Tercera División players
Primera Federación players
Real Sociedad B footballers
Real Sociedad footballers
SD Ponferradina players
CD Numancia players
Gimnàstic de Tarragona footballers
Cultural Leonesa footballers
Cypriot First Division players
AEL Limassol players
Karmiotissa FC players
Liga I players
FC Viitorul Constanța players
Indian Super League players
NorthEast United FC players
Spain youth international footballers
Spanish expatriate footballers
Expatriate footballers in Cyprus
Expatriate footballers in Romania
Expatriate footballers in India
Spanish expatriate sportspeople in Cyprus
Spanish expatriate sportspeople in Romania
Spanish expatriate sportspeople in India